Lindley Winslow is an experimental nuclear and particle physicist, and associate professor at MIT.

Biography 
Winslow grew up in Chadds Ford, Pennsylvania.

Winslow completed her BA in physics in 2001 and her PhD in 2008 at University of California at Berkeley, before doing a postdoc at MIT. She was an assistant professor at University of California, Los Angeles before moving back to MIT in 2015, where she works on the search for dark matter.

In 2016 Winslow was consulted on the equations in the Ghostbusters reboot film.

In 2018 Winslow established a grant programme especially for women physicists.

Awards and honours 
 2021 – Fellow of the American Physical Society for "leadership in the search for axion-like particles that may be dark matter candidates, and for the establishment of the groundbreaking ABRACADABRA detector for this search, and also for valuable detector development for the field of neutrinoless double beta decay."
 2016 – UCLA Hellman Fellow
 2011 – Michelson Postdoctoral Prize Lectureship
 2010 – L'Oreal USA Fellowship For Women in Science

Selected publications

References

External links 
 Winslow Lab | Yay Winslow Group!

Living people
Women nuclear physicists
Particle physicists
Massachusetts Institute of Technology faculty
American women physicists
University of California, Berkeley alumni
21st-century American physicists
21st-century American women scientists
American nuclear physicists
Year of birth missing (living people)
Fellows of the American Physical Society